The American College of Surgeons is an educational association of surgeons created in 1913.

See also
 American College of Physicians

References

External links
 
 ACS Foundation
 ACS Archives
 Journal of the American College of Surgeons
 ACS Professional Association
 ACS Political Contributions (opensecrets.org)

1912 establishments in Illinois
Surgical organizations based in the United States
Medical and health professional associations in Chicago
Organizations established in 1912
American College of Surgeons